Aftab Gul Khan (Urdu: آفتاب گل خان) (born 31 March 1946) is a former Pakistani cricketer who played in six Test matches from 1969 to 1971.

Gul was an opening batsman who represented a number of first-class sides in Pakistan from 1964–65 to 1977–78. His initial selection in the Test side, when England toured Pakistan during 1968-69 amid political turmoil, had less to do with his cricketing abilities than with his position as a student leader, in an attempt to placate the rioters.

Gul scored more than 1000 runs in the tour of England in 1971. In the first over of the First Test at Birmingham in that series, he was struck on the head by a ball from Alan Ward and was forced to retire. This injury drew the famous line from Brian Johnston on the BBC the next day: "Gul's all right. The doctor inspected his head this morning and found nothing in it." He also toured England in 1974 but was less successful and did not play any of the Tests.

He is a lawyer by profession. Gul initially represented the cricketer Salman Butt in the 2010 Pakistan cricket spot-fixing scandal.

References

External links
 

Pakistani lawyers
Pakistan Test cricketers
1946 births
Living people
Pakistani cricketers
Punjab University cricketers
Lahore cricketers
Pakistan Universities cricketers
Lahore A cricketers
Lahore Greens cricketers
Lahore Blues cricketers
Punjab A cricketers
Service Industries cricketers
Lahore City cricketers
Central Zone (Pakistan) cricketers
Punjab (Pakistan) cricketers
People from Gujar Khan